Gore-Tex is a waterproof, breathable fabric membrane and registered trademark of W. L. Gore & Associates. Invented in 1969, Gore-Tex can repel liquid water while allowing water vapor to pass through and is designed to be a lightweight, waterproof fabric for all-weather use. It is composed of stretched polytetrafluoroethylene (PTFE), which is more commonly known by the generic trademark Teflon. The material is formally known as the generic term expanded PTFE (ePTFE).

History 

Gore-Tex was co-invented by Wilbert L. Gore and Gore's son, Robert W. Gore. In 1969, Bob Gore stretched heated rods of polytetrafluoroethylene (PTFE) and created expanded polytetrafluoroethylene (ePTFE). His discovery of the right conditions for stretching PTFE was a happy accident, born partly of frustration. Instead of slowly stretching the heated material, he applied a sudden, accelerating yank. The solid PTFE unexpectedly stretched about 800%, forming a microporous structure that was about 70% air. It was introduced to the public under the trademark Gore-Tex.

Gore promptly applied for and obtained the following patents:
 , issued April 27, 1976, for a porous form of polytetrafluoroethylene with a micro-structure characterized by nodes interconnected by fibrils
 , issued February 5, 1980
  on March 18, 1980 for a "waterproof laminate", together with Samuel Allen

Another form of stretched PTFE tape was produced prior to Gore-Tex in 1966, by John W. Cropper of New Zealand. Cropper had developed and constructed a machine for this use. However, Cropper chose to keep the process of creating expanded PTFE as a closely held trade secret and as such, it had remained unpublished.

In the 1970s Garlock, Inc. allegedly infringed Gore's patents by using Cropper's machine and was sued by Gore in the Federal District Court of Ohio. The District Court held Gore's product and process patents to be invalid after a "bitterly contested case" that "involved over two years of discovery, five weeks of trial, the testimony of 35 witnesses (19 live, 16 by deposition), and over 300 exhibits" (quoting the Federal Circuit). On appeal, however, the Federal Circuit disagreed in the famous case of Gore v. Garlock, reversing the lower court's decision on the ground, as well as others, that Cropper forfeited any superior claim to the invention by virtue of having concealed the process for making ePTFE from the public. As a public patent had not been filed, the new form of the material could not be legally recognised. Gore was thereby established as the legal inventor of ePTFE.

Following the Gore v. Garlock decision, Gore sued C. R. Bard for allegedly infringing its patent by making ePTFE vascular grafts. Bard promptly settled and agreed to exit the market. Gore next sued IMPRA, Inc., a smaller maker of ePTFE vascular grafts, in the federal district court in Arizona. IMPRA had a competing patent application for the ePTFE vascular graft. In a nearly decade-long patent/antitrust battle (1984–1993), IMPRA proved that Gore-Tex was identical to prior art disclosed in a Japanese process patent by duplicating the prior art process and through statistical analysis, and also proved that Gore had withheld the best mode for using its patent, and the main claim of Gore's product patent was declared invalid in 1990. In 1996, IMPRA was purchased by Bard and Bard was thereby able to reenter the market. After IMPRA's vascular graft patent was issued, Bard sued Gore for infringing it.

Gore-Tex is used in products manufactured by many different companies.

Other products have come to market exploiting similar technologies following the expiry of the main Gore-Tex patent.

For his invention, Robert W. Gore was inducted into the U.S. National Inventors Hall of Fame in 2006.

In 2015, Gore was ordered by the Federal Circuit Court of Appeals to pay Bard $1 billion in damages. The U.S. Supreme Court declined to review the Federal Circuit's decision.

Environmental concerns

PTFE is a fluoropolymer made using an emulsion polymerization process that utilizes the fluorosurfactant PFOA, a persistent environmental contaminant. In 2013, Gore eliminated the use of PFOAs in the manufacture of its weatherproof functional fabrics.
Gore has published a plan for phasing out the most harmful perfluorinated compounds (PFCs) by 2025 but has defended the use of PTFE. However, research in 2020 found it is not possible to conclude that the harmful effects of PTFE and other fluoropolymers on environmental and human health are of low concern.

Applications

Gore-Tex materials are typically based on thermo-mechanically expanded PTFE and other fluoropolymer products. They are used in a wide variety of applications such as high-performance fabrics, medical implants, filter media, insulation for wires and cables, gaskets, and sealants. However, Gore-Tex fabric is best known for its use in protective, yet breathable, rainwear.

Use in rainwear 
Before the introduction of Gore-Tex, the simplest sort of rainwear would consist of a two-layer sandwich, where the outer layer would typically be woven nylon or polyester to provide strength. The inner one would be polyurethane (abbreviated: PU) to provide water resistance, at the cost of breathability.

Early Gore-Tex fabric replaced the inner layer of non-breathable PU with a thin, porous fluoropolymer membrane (Teflon) coating that is bonded to a fabric. This membrane had about 9 billion pores per square inch (around 1.4 billion pores per square centimeter). Each pore is approximately  the size of a water droplet, making it impenetrable to liquid water while still allowing the more volatile water vapor molecules to pass through.

The outer layer of Gore-Tex fabric is coated on the outside with a Durable Water Repellent (DWR) treatment. The DWR prevents the main outer layer from becoming wet, which would reduce the breathability of the whole fabric. However, the DWR is not responsible for the jacket being waterproof. Without the DWR, the outer layer would become soaked, there would be no breathability, and the wearer's sweat being produced on the inside would fail to evaporate, leading to dampness there. This might give the appearance that the fabric is leaking when it is not. Wear and cleaning will reduce the performance of Gore-Tex fabric by wearing away this Durable Water Repellent (DWR) treatment. The DWR can be reinvigorated by tumble drying the garment or ironing on a low setting.

Gore requires that all garments made from their material have taping over the seams, to eliminate leaks. Gore's sister product, Windstopper, is similar to Gore-Tex in being windproof and breathable, and it can stretch, but it is not waterproof. The Gore naming system does not imply any specific technology or material but instead implies a specific set of performance characteristics.

Use in other clothing 
Expanded polytetrafluoroethylene is used in clothing due to its breathability and water protection capabilities. Besides use in rainwear ePTFE can now be found in space suits.

Other uses 
Gore-Tex is also used internally in medical applications, because it is nearly inert inside the body. Specifically, expanded polytetrafluoroethylene (E-PTFE) can take the form of a fabric-like mesh. Implementing and applying the mesh form in the medical field is a promising type of technological material feature. In addition, the porosity of Gore-Tex permits the body's own tissue to grow through the material, integrating grafted material into the circulation system. Gore-Tex is used in a wide variety of medical applications, including sutures, vascular grafts, heart patches, and synthetic knee ligaments, which have saved thousands of lives. In the form of expanded polytetrafluoroethylene (E-PTFE), Gore-Tex has been shown to be a reliable synthetic, medical material in treating patients with nasal dorsal interruptions. In more recent observations, expanded polytetrafluoroethylene (E-PTFE) has recently been used as membrane implants for glaucoma surgery.

Gore-Tex has been used for many years in the conservation of illuminated manuscripts.

Explosive sensors have been printed on Gore-Tex clothing leading to the sensitive voltametric detection of nitroaromatic compounds.

The "Gore-Tex" brand name was formerly used for industrial and medical products.

Alternative technologies
For applications in textiles and garments, there are a number of competing semipermeable membranes on the market that attempt to reproduce the "breathability" (water vapor transport) of ePTFE while effectively repelling water. Materials like Sympatex, Futurelight (marketed by The North Face) can be used in textile laminates much like ePTFE, but often perform less well in terms of water vapor transport and durability.

Active textile pumping technology, namely textile-based electroosmotic pumps, are being developed and commercialized by companies such as LunaMicro AB. These solutions can eliminate the use of halogenated polymers like PTFE, minimizing the associated negative health and environmental hazards.

See also
 Extended Cold Weather Clothing System
 Hipora
 SympaTex
 PrimaLoft
 "The Dinner Party" (Seinfeld)

References

External links 

 
 Gore website

American inventions
Brand name materials
Fluoropolymers
Products introduced in 1976
Technical fabrics